During World War II, the Political Warfare Executive (PWE) was a British clandestine body created to produce and disseminate both white and black propaganda, with the aim of damaging enemy morale and sustaining the morale of countries occupied or allied with Nazi Germany.

History
The Executive was formed in August 1941, reporting to the Foreign Office. The staff came mostly from SO1, which had been until then the propaganda arm of the Special Operations Executive. The organisation was governed by a committee initially comprising Anthony Eden, (Foreign Secretary), Brendan Bracken, (Minister of Information) and Hugh Dalton, (Minister of Economic Warfare), together with officials Rex Leeper, Dallas Brooks and Robert Bruce Lockhart as chairman (and later Director General). Roundell Palmer (the future 3rd Earl of Selbourne) later replaced Dalton when he was moved to become President of the Board of Trade. Ivone Kirkpatrick, an advisor to the BBC and formerly a diplomat in Berlin, also joined the committee, while Leeper left to become British Ambassador to Greece.

PWE included staff from the Ministry of Information, the propaganda elements of the Special Operations Executive, and from the BBC. Its main headquarters was at Woburn Abbey with London offices at the BBC's Bush House. As the Political Warfare Executive was a secret department, when dealing with the outside world it used the cover name Political Intelligence Department (PID).

After D-Day most of PWE's white propaganda staff transferred to the Psychological Warfare Division (PWD/SHAEF) of SHAEF.

At the end of World War II PWE were tasked with the re-education of German prisoners of war. As with different types of propaganda, PWE used the same 'white', 'grey', and 'black' classifications for German POWs. Prisoners classed as 'black' were considered dangerous ardent Nazis, with anti-Nazis classed as 'white' and regular non-political soldiers classed as 'grey'.

Activities

Activities of the PWE included distributing covert propaganda ranging from broadcasts to loudspeaker operations to lower morale and encourage desertion, leaflet drops, and underground publications in occupied countries, running rumour campaigns and creating forgeries, among others.

The main forms of propaganda were in the form of radio broadcasts and printed postcards, leaflets and documents. PWE created a number of clandestine radio stations including Gustav Siegfried Eins, Soldatensender Calais and Kurzwellesender Atlantik.

In order to deliver its subversive messages, PWE also disseminated information on events in Germany and the occupied countries, gathering intelligence from other services and agencies, including POW interrogations, and newspapers obtained from occupied countries, and bombing raid photo analysis. This latter source was used to broadcast lists of streets (and even individual houses) that had been destroyed and on occasion to mock up faked "real time" reports of the German media.

Some PWE's activities were controversial, such as impersonating deceased German soldiers and 
sending food parcels to their families with pacifist messages on their behalf. Later, Sefton Delmer, who ran a British black propaganda radio station during the war, quipped that although family hopes to see their loved ones were false, the ham was real.

See also
Special Operations Executive
Psychological warfare
Psychological Warfare Division
Airborne leaflet propaganda
Information Research Department

References

Further reading
The Secret History of PWE - Political Warfare Executive 1939-1945, (St Ermin's Press, 2002), David Garnett. 
The Fourth Arm - Psychological Warfare 1938-45, (Davis-Poynter, 1977), Charles Cruickshank. 
The Black Game - British Subversive Operations Against the Germans During the Second World War, (Michael Joseph, 1982), Ellic Howe. 
British Propaganda to France, 1940-1944: Machinery, Method and Message, (Edinburgh University Press, 2007), Tim Brooks.

External links

 The PsyWar Society: Black Propaganda and propaganda leaflets database, a website with articles on psychological warfare and a library of propaganda leaflets from World War I to the present day.
Political Warfare Executive
Allied Propaganda in World War II and the British Political Warfare Executive, the files of the Political Warfare Executive (PWE) kept at the U.K. National Archives
The Political Warfare Executive, Covert Propaganda, and British Culture, The Centre for Modern Conflicts and Cultures, Durham University 

British Empire in World War II
British intelligence services of World War II
British propaganda organisations
Foreign Office during World War II
Groups of World War II
Government agencies established in 1941
History of telecommunications in the United Kingdom
Military history of Bedfordshire
Psychological warfare
Science and technology in Bedfordshire
Woburn, Bedfordshire
1941 establishments in the United Kingdom
Black propaganda organisations
Anthony Eden